Licia Ronzulli (born 14 September 1975 in Milan) is an Italian politician and a former MEP who represented The People of Freedom party and New Forza Italia party in the years 2009-14. She won a seat in the 2009 European Parliament election. She was Vice Chair of the Delegation to the ACP-EU Joint Parliamentary Assembly and a member of the Employment and Social Affairs committee.

She is known for being the logistic organiser of Silvio Berlusconi's parties, known in the press as Bunga bunga parties. During her tenure as MEP, she has taken her daughter, Vittoria, to the European Parliament plenary sessions in Strasbourg. Prior to becoming an MEP, she was a nurse in Milan.

Biography

Daughter of a carabiniere of Apulian origins, Licia Ronzulli began her career working as a nurse in a hospital. In 2003, she became nurses’ coordinator at the IRCCS Galeazzi hospital of Milan, in Italy. Since 2005 she has been a volunteer of the non-profit organization Progetto Sorriso Nel Mondo, with which she travels to Bangladesh every year together with a surgical team specialized in the care of malformed children. 

From 29 April 2015 to 13 January 2017, she was a member of the Board of Directors of Fiera di Milano SpA, as Vice President and Independent Director.

During the 2008 Italian general election, she was nominated for The People of Freedom party in the district of Marche. When she was a candidate in the 2009 European elections, Licia Ronzulli was elected in the northwest of Italy with 40,016 votes. She joined the European People Party and became a member of the commission for Employment and Social Affairs and member of the Delegation for Relations with South Asia, as well as a substitute member of the Commission of Women Rights and Gender Equality and the Subcommittee on Human Rights. On 16 September 2009 she was elected Vice-Chairman of the Parliamentary Joint Africa-Caribbean-Pacific-UE Assembly, which has the express purpose of promoting human rights and democracy.
She has also been involved with Progetto Sorriso nel Mondo (Smile Project in the World) as a volunteer. So far, Licia Ronzulli has presented over a hundred questions to the European Commission dealing with themes such as combating the spread of serious diseases in the European Union.

In the 2018 Italian general election, Ronzulli was elected to the Senate of the Republic, representing the constituency of Cantù.

Personal life 
Ronzulli has a daughter, Vittoria, born in Milan on August 10, 2010 from the union with Renato Cerioli, manager and president of Confindustria Monza and Brianza. Two years later the couple separated. On 22 September 2010, Ronzulli took her 44-day-old daughter, Vittoria, to a plenary session of the European Parliament.

The French magazine Madame le Figaro placed her in 3rd place on its list of most influential women of 2010.

References

External links

 Page on the site of Europarliament

1975 births
Living people
Politicians from Milan
The People of Freedom MEPs
The People of Freedom politicians
Forza Italia (2013) politicians
Senators of Legislature XVIII of Italy
Members of the Italian Senate from Lombardy
MEPs for Italy 2009–2014
21st-century Italian women politicians
Forza Italia (2013) senators
20th-century Italian women
Women members of the Senate of the Republic (Italy)